The Beautiful is the second album and the first studio recording by Triptych Myth, a trio consisting of Cooper-Moore on piano, Tom Abbs on bass and Chad Taylor on drums. It was recorded in 2005 and released on the AUM Fidelity label. "Frida K. The Beautiful" is dedicated to Mexican painter Frida Kahlo. "Pooch" is dedicated to bassist Wilber Morris.

Reception
The All About Jazz review by Michael McCaw states "The Beautiful is a deeply affecting album of piano-driven interplay that seamlessly spans a range of jazz genres without a hint of trepidation or a false step."

In his review for JazzTimes Mike Shanley notes that "Free jazz might often consist of blistering, harsh sonorities, but these three prove that the quest for beauty is as much a part of this music as catharsis."

Track listing
All compositions by Cooper-Moore except as indicated
 "All Up in It" – 4:54
 "Frida K. The Beautiful" – 5:22
 "Trident" – 4:16
 "Spiraling Out" – 6:44
 "Pooch" – 5:52
 "A Time To" – 5:01
 "Last Minute Trip Part One" – 1:46
 "Last Minute Trip Part Two" – 3:18
 "Poppa's Gin in the Chicken Feed" – 7:13
 "Robinia Pseudoacacia" – 3:56

Personnel
Cooper-Moore – piano
Tom Abbs – bass
Chad Taylor - drums

References

2005 albums
Cooper-Moore albums
AUM Fidelity albums